Juliette Gosselin (born June 15, 1991) is a Canadian actress.

Career 

She made her film debut in the 2004 film Battle of the Brave. In 2005, at the 25th Genie Awards, she was nominated for the Genie Award for Best Performance by an Actress in a Supporting Role for her role in this film.

Gosselin has played characters in films of various genres, including the drama films Familia (2005), You're Sleeping Nicole (2014), Kiss Me Like a Lover (2016) and Boost (2017), the horror films Martyrs (2008), The Gracefield Incident (2017) and the thriller films The Fall of the American Empire (2018) and The Hummingbird Project (2018).

In 2016 and 2017, she played the role of Martine in the crime drama television series 19-2.

She also played the character of young Yeesha in the 2004 video game Myst IV: Revelation.

Filmography 
 2004: Battle of the Brave (Nouvelle-France), Young France Carignan
 2005: Familia,  Gabrielle
 2006: Family History (Histoire de famille), Monique Gagné, age 12
 2006: Deliver Me (Délivrez-moi),  Sophie
 2008: Martyrs,  Marie
 2011: La vérité,  Lydia
 2014: You're Sleeping Nicole (Tu dors Nicole), Maude Cloutier
 2015: Switch & Bitch,  Fanny
 2015: Darwin,  Dara
 2016: Kiss Me Like a Lover (Embrasse-moi comme tu m'aimes), Berthe Sauvageau
 2017: Boost,  Anna
 2017: Tadoussac,  Laurie
 2017: The Gracefield Incident, Julia Gilbert
 2018: 1991, Marie-Ève Bernard
 2018: The Fall of the American Empire, Resident female doctor
 2018: The Hummingbird Project, Young Amish Woman
 2019: Forgotten Flowers (Les fleurs oubliées), Lili de la Rosbil
 2019: Fabulous (Fabuleuses), Clara Diamond
 2021: Virage, Fanny

References

External links 
 
 
 

1991 births
Living people
Canadian child actresses
Canadian film actresses
Canadian television actresses
21st-century Canadian actresses
20th-century Canadian actresses
Actresses from Quebec
People from Beaconsfield, Quebec
Canadian video game actresses